Finn Creek Open Air Museum is a Finnish-American open-air museum. The museum documents the early Finnish immigrants' lifestyles and experiences in the New York Mills area. The museum hosts an annual festival in late August that highlights music, food, and entertainment that reflects the Finnish-American experience.

History
In 1900, a Finnish family by the name of Siifert and Wilhelmiina Tapio purchased the present Finn Creek acreage from Herman Arola and the St. Paul Railway Co.  The price per acre was about $3. and they purchased .  Construction of the Tapios' house began immediately, and the family moved into their new home in 1901.  The Tapio family lived and farmed the land in the late 19th century.  They had nine children, five of whom lived to be adults (Sylvester, Maimie, Hilma, Hilda, Helga, Tecia, Ida, Sadie, Kalle).  Kalle Tapio died at age 3, leaving Sylvester Tapio as the only son.

In 1975, the State Finnish American Historical Society purchased one acre of land at Finn Creek.  Another  were purchased since that time through grants, local funding and promotions. The land was purchased from an individual land owner in 1975.  Only the Tapios had lived on the land. The buildings on the site were restored reminiscent of the late 19th century to the early 20th century.

Mission and purpose
Currently volunteers work to maintain the buildings, and create an environment for preserving the Finnish-American history.  The museum is also keenly interested in staying current with Finland today and looking into the future.

Festival
Demonstrations at the festival include:  Sawmilling, threshing, rug weaving.
Entertainment at the festival has included:  The Upper Mississippians Swing Orchestra, Kip Peltoniemi
Finnish foods at the festival include:  karjalan piirakka, lusikkaleivat.

Finn Creek Store

The Finn Creek Store (also known as the Heinola Store) also specializes in Marimekko textiles, Iittala glass, sauna supplies, and other Finnish products.

References

External links
 Finn Creek Open Air Museum

Open-air museums in Minnesota
Ethnic museums in Minnesota
Museums in Otter Tail County, Minnesota
Finnish-American history
Finnish-American culture in Minnesota
European-American museums
Museums established in 1975
1975 establishments in Minnesota